Nat "Sweetwater" Clifton (born Clifton Nathaniel; October 13, 1922 – August 31, 1990) was an American professional basketball and baseball player. He is best known as one of the first African Americans to play in the National Basketball Association (NBA).

Biography

Early life 
Born in England, Arkansas, Clifton was given the "Sweetwater" nickname as a boy because of his love of soft drinks and his easy disposition. His family moved to Chicago, Illinois, where he became an outstanding basketball and baseball player at DuSable High School, graduating in 1942. He attended Xavier University of Louisiana in New Orleans and then served with the United States Army for three years, fighting in Europe during World War II.

Early career 
After the war, Clifton joined the New York Rens, an all-black professional basketball team that toured throughout the United States. Noted for his large hands, which required a size 14 glove, he was invited to join the Harlem Globetrotters, for whom he played from the summer of 1948 to the spring of 1950. Still a talented baseball first baseman, during the basketball off-season in 1949 Clifton played for the Chicago American Giants in Negro league baseball. By 1950, his performance with the Globetrotters, in particular his exceptional ball-handling ability, led to his signing a contract with an NBA team.

NBA career 
On May 24, 1950, Clifton became the second African-American player to sign an NBA contract. He played his first game for the New York Knicks on November 4, four days after the debut of Washington Capitols player Earl Lloyd, the first black player to appear in an NBA game. Already 27 years old when he made his debut, Clifton in his first season helped lead the team to its first-ever appearance in the NBA finals, losing in game seven. During his eight seasons in the NBA, Clifton averaged 10 points and 9 rebounds per game. He was named to the 1957 NBA All-Star team, scoring 8 points in 23 minutes in the game. At age 34, he became the oldest player in NBA history to be named a first time All-Star.

In 1957, Clifton was part of a multi-player trade between the Knicks and the Fort Wayne Pistons, but after one season in Detroit he retired from basketball. In the summer of 1958, he joined the Detroit Clowns baseball team in the Negro leagues, along with his former Harlem Globetrotters teammate Reece "Goose" Tatum.

In 1961, he was coaxed out of retirement by the Chicago Majors of the fledgling American Basketball League (ABL). After the league folded at the end of 1962, the 40-year-old Clifton retired permanently.

Clifton died at age 67 on August 31, 1990, in Chicago. He was interred in the Restvale Cemetery in the Chicago suburb of Alsip.

Legacy
Clifton's contributions to his community during his sporting career and after his playing days have been recognized by the Associated Black Charities of New York City. They have honored him by naming one of the Black History Maker Awards the Nathaniel 'Sweetwater' Clifton Award. 

In 2005, the New York Knicks basketball team renamed their monthly "City Spirit Award" in his honor. The Sweetwater Clifton City Spirit Award is given to a member of the community who goes above and beyond his or her normal duties to make the lives of others in the tri-state area better.

Clifton, who played softball for the Brown Bombers and Capitol Records team of the "Daddy O" Daylie League, was also inducted into Chicago 16 Inch Softball Hall of Fame.

On February 14, 2014, Clifton was announced as a 2014 inductee by the Naismith Memorial Basketball Hall of Fame. He formally entered the Hall as a contributor on August 8.

Sweetwater, a film on Clifton's life has been in planning with Sunset Pictures since 2007 and is due for release on April 14, 2023.

NBA career statistics

Regular season

Playoffs

See also

Race and ethnicity in the NBA
List of African American firsts

Notes

References

External links

1922 births
1990 deaths
African-American basketball players
American men's basketball players
Basketball players from Arkansas
Centers (basketball)
Chicago American Giants players
Chicago Majors players
Detroit Pistons players
Harlem Globetrotters players
Naismith Memorial Basketball Hall of Fame inductees
National Basketball Association All-Stars
New York Knicks players
Power forwards (basketball)
Basketball players from Chicago
Sportspeople from Arkansas
Undrafted National Basketball Association players
Xavier Gold Rush basketball players
United States Army personnel of World War II
20th-century African-American sportspeople